Ndowa N Lale is a Nigerian academic and publisher. He is the 8th substantive Vice-Chancellor of the University of Port Harcourt in Rivers state, Nigeria.

Education

Ndowa received his secondary school education in Ascension High School, Ogale Eleme, Rivers State. From 1972 to 1976 he attended secondary school and Federal Government College, Port Harcourt. He earned his Advanced Level G.C.E. in Biology, Chemistry and Geography from 1976 to 1978 at University of Maiduguri, Maiduguri for B.Sc (Hons.) Agriculture Crop Science from 1978 to 1981 which he finished with a First Class. He earned his PhD at the University of Newcastle upon Tyne in Agricultural Entomology.

Career

Ndowa is a member of TETFUND Screening and Monitoring Committee under the  National Research Fund Intervention. In 2012 he began serving as Vice-Chancellor, Rivers State University of Science and Technology, Nkpolu. He was a Member, Appointments and Promotions Committee, Rivers State University of Science and Technology, Port Harcourt. He served as Editor-in-Chief for the Nigerian Journal of Entomology. He served as Professor of Entomology, Department of Crop and Soil Science Faculty of Agriculture in the University of Port Harcourt.

Personal life

Ndowa is married and has children.
He hails from the town of Ebubu in Eleme Local Government Area of Rivers State.

Employment and position held

References

 
 

Living people
Year of birth missing (living people)
Nigerian academics
Nigerian academic administrators
Educators from Rivers State